Kazakhstan–Malaysia relations refers to foreign relations between Kazakhstan and Malaysia. Kazakhstan has an embassy in Kuala Lumpur, and Malaysia has an embassy in Astana.

History 

Diplomatic relations between both countries were established on 16 March 1992.

State visits
In May 1996, the President of Kazakhstan Nursultan Nazarbayev has made the first official visit to Malaysia while in the same year in July, the Malaysian Prime Minister Mahathir Mohamad reciprocated with the official visit to Kazakhstan.

Economic relations
Both Kazakhstan and Malaysia are on the way to expand trade and economic co-operation. A number of documents also signed by both sides to forge closer ties between them. In 2011, the total trade between the two countries was valued at US$61.1 million. Both countries also work together in the technology exchange, Islamic financing and in the join venture on halal sector. At least 15,000 Kazakhstanis have visited Malaysia in 2011 since a direct flights been introduced by Air Astana between Almaty and Kuala Lumpur. In 2016, the total trade reach US$49.22 million with Malaysia's largest export to Kazakhstan is coffee-based preparations while the biggest imports from Kazakhstan were zinc and television components. On 4 May 2017, both countries agreed on 11 areas of economic co-operation.

Malaysian Ambassadors to Kazakhstan 
 Tang Sung Soon March 2001 March 2004
 Tang Tai Hin May 2004 June 2008
 Saw Ching Hong February 2009 October 2010
 Ahmad Rasidi Hazizi May 2011 December 2013
 Hidayat Abdul Hamid January 2014 March 2017
 Said Mohamad Bakri Said Abd Rahman April 2017 Current

Further reading 
 Bilateral relations of Kazakhstan and Malaysia in 2010
 Visit of Malaysian MP to Kazakhstan opens new page in bilateral relations: Kazakh senator

See also 
 Foreign relations of Kazakhstan
 Foreign relations of Malaysia

References

External links 
 Kazakhstan-Malaysia Chamber of Commerce

 
Malaysia
Bilateral relations of Malaysia